Rick James (1948–2004) was an American singer-songwriter, multi-instrumentalist and record producer.

Rick James may also refer to:

 Rick James (actor) (1939–2018), also activist/politician from Antigua
 Rick James (baseball) (born 1947), American baseball player
 "Rick James", a 2014 song by Keyshia Cole from Point of No Return
 "Rick James", a 2013 song by Nelly from M.O.
 Richard D. James (aka Aphex Twin), an electronic/IDM artist

See also
 "Rick James Sketch", a comedy sketch